Five Bedrooms is an Australian comedy-drama television series, which first  screened on Network 10. The eight part series premiered on 15 May 2019, at 8:40 pm. In the United States, the series started streaming on Peacock on April 15, 2020.

In October 2019, the drama was renewed for a second season by 10 which was set premiere in 2020, however due to the COVID-19 pandemic, the second season was rescheduled to air in 2021 instead. In May 2021, the Australian broadcast of the series was announced to be moving from Network 10 to the 10 affiliated streaming service, Paramount+. Filming of the fourth season began in Melbourne in September 2022.

Synopsis
Five Bedrooms tells the story of five people at different times of their lives. They bond after they find themselves seated together at the singles table at a wedding. After a few too many drinks, the solution to all of their problems seems to be buying a house together; a five bedroom house.

Production
In January 2019, it was announced Roy Joseph, Doris Younane, Katie Robertson, Kat Stewart, Stephen Peacocke, Kate Jenkinson and Hugh Sheridan had been cast in the new drama. In July 2021, it was announced that Rodger Corser would join the cast of the second season to guest star as Stuart, Liz's ex-husband. In October 2019, the drama was renewed for a second season by Network 10 which began filming in February 2020 before the production was closed down in March 2020 due to the COVID-19 pandemic. The second season's production resumed filming between June and July 2020. On 6 May 2021, it was announced the series moved to Paramount+, and that the second season premiered on 11 August 2021, coinciding with the Australian re-branding of 10 All Access to Paramount+. In October 2020, it was announced that a third season had been renewed which began filming in August 2021. It premiered on New Year's Day 2022. In May 2022, it was announced that a fourth season had been renewed which would begin filming in October 2022.

Cast

Main cast
 Kat Stewart as Liz Wendell
 Stephen Peacocke as Ben Chigwell
 Doris Younane as Heather Doyle
 Katie Robertson as Ainsley Elling
 Roy Joseph as Harpreet "Harry" Sethi
 Hugh Sheridan as Lachlan Best (season 1–2)
 Johnny Carr as Kevin "Simmo" Fitzsimons (season 3; recurring season 1–2)

Recurring cast

Episodes

Series overview 
<onlyinclude>

Season 1 (2019)

Season 2 (2021)

Season 3 (2022)

Ratings

Season 1

International broadcast
Five Bedrooms was shown on BBC One from 10 March 2020, and was the fifth Australian drama to be broadcast on the BBC after Out of the Blue, The Doctor Blake Mysteries, A Place to Call Home and 800 Words since the broadcasting rights of Neighbours went to Channel 5 in 2008.  Five Bedrooms airs on Peacock in the United States. It was also shown on RTP2 in Portugal and began airing on W Network in Canada in 2021. It began airing on RTÉ2 in the Republic of Ireland in July 2021, season two aired from November 2021 and season three from July 2022.

References

External links
 
 Production website
 

Australian comedy-drama television series
2010s romantic comedy television series
2010s romantic drama television series
2019 Australian television series debuts
2020s romantic comedy television series
2020s romantic drama television series
Network 10 original programming
Television productions suspended due to the COVID-19 pandemic
Television shows set in Melbourne
English-language television shows
Paramount+ original programming